Snuella lapsa is a Gram-negative, aerobic and rod-shaped bacterium from the genus of Snuella which has been isolated from tidal flat sediments from the Ganghwa Island.

References

Flavobacteria
Bacteria described in 2011